is a railway station in Tawaramoto, Nara, Japan, serving passengers traveling on Kintetsu Railway's Tawaramoto Line. It is 2.0 km (1.2 mi) from Nishi-Tawaramoto, while 8.1 km (5.0 miles) from Shin-Ōji.

Lines 
 Kintetsu Railway
 Tawaramoto Line

Platform and track

Surrounding 
 Kokuho Central Hospital

Gallery

External links
 

Railway stations in Japan opened in 1918
Railway stations in Nara Prefecture
Tawaramoto, Nara